Calliostoma escondidum is a species of sea snail, a marine gastropod mollusk, in the family Calliostomatidae within the superfamily Trochoidea, the top snails, turban snails and their allies.

C. escondidum was originally described as Calliostoma escondida, using an incorrect gender of specific epithet.

References

escondidum
Gastropods described in 2014